The Mitsubishi Colt is a nameplate from Mitsubishi Motors that has been applied to a number of automobiles since 1962. It was first introduced with a series of kei and subcompact cars in the 1960s, and then for the export version of the subcompact Mirage between 1978 and 2002. Chrysler, Mitsubishi's longtime partner, also used the name when applying its long-running practice of rebadging Mitsubishi vehicles as the Dodge and Plymouth Colt captive imports for the North American market between 1970 and 1994.

The most recent version was a subcompact car model manufactured between 2002 and 2013, sold under the Colt nameplate internationally. Mitsubishi replaced this series in 2013 with a newer generation which reverted to the Mirage name.

In addition to these small cars, "Colt" in the Mitsubishi vernacular has been used for unrelated vehicles of various forms as discussed below. The name has also been disaffiliated from Mitsubishi as an independent marque in some markets.

Nameplate history 

The "Colt" nameplate was first introduced in 1962, which started as a line of small cars sold predominantly in Japan. These models continued on in various similar forms until 1971. Between 1978 and 2002, the nameplate was applied to export versions of the Mirage in markets such as Europe and for a time, in Australia. Between 2002 and 2013, the nameplate was referred to a subcompact hatchback (and derivative body styles) that replaced the Mirage line. Unlike previously, the "Colt" nameplate was used internationally.

Various other unrelated models have been designated "Colt" over time as well. The L200 pickup truck in South Africa utilised the "Colt" nameplate from 1992 to 2008. The nameplate is also used in Indonesia for a series of light commercial vehicles consisting of Delica-based "Colt T100/T120/L300" (1968–present), Suzuki Carry-based "Colt T120SS" (1991–2019), and Canter-based "Colt T200/Diesel" (1975–2022).

Colt was also used as a marque from 1974 to 1984 by the Colt Car Company to market Mitsubishi vehicles in the United Kingdom. In New Zealand, the Colt brand ceased in favour of the Mitsubishi name in 1970, upon the release of the "Dyna-wedge" Galant model.

Colt 600, 800, 1000, 1100, 1200, 1500 (1962–1971) 

Mitsubishi introduced the "Colt" name in 1962 on the Mitsubishi Colt 600, the first of a line of small family cars complementing their Mitsubishi 500, the company's first post-war passenger car. The Colt 600 is powered by a 594 cc NE35B OHV air-cooled straight-twin engine. At this time, Mitsubishi did not yet exist as an autonomous company, and vehicles were being produced by three regional subsidiaries of Mitsubishi Heavy Industries. MHI, which had been formally dismantled after World War II, resumed operating as a single entity in 1964, but continued to use the "Colt" marque until the 1970s in Asia, and the 1980s in Europe.

To complement the 600, a larger compact car was introduced in 1963, the Colt 1000. The larger Colt 1500 arrived in 1965, the Colt 1100 replaced the Colt 1000 in 1966, and the Colt 1200 took the 1100's place in 1968.

The third Colt line was the smaller, fastback Colt 800 and its derivatives the 1000F, 1100F, and 11-F. This series was built from 1965 until late 1971.

Mirage-based Colt (1978–2002) 

Mitsubishi reintroduced the Colt nameplate as a front-wheel drive hatchback in 1978, with a sedan later released in 1982. Sold in Japan as the Mirage, the Colt name was restricted to markets such as Europe and Australia (where the Colt was built by Mitsubishi Motors Australia from 1982 to late 1989).

Five generations of Mirage-based Colts were sold between 1978 and 2002, with new generations released in 1983, 1987, 1991, and 1995. These Mirage derivatives were sold in various forms as the Mitsubishi Lancer in many markets, with the Colt nameplate in Europe typically restricted to the hatchback variants; sedans and station wagons were relegated to the Lancer name.

Colt (Z30; 2002) 

In November 2002, a new Colt was released by Mitsubishi in Japan with a design by Olivier Boulay and built on the same platform as the Smart Forfour. In Japan, it was sold at a specific retail chain called Galant Shop. A European version made at Mitsubishi's NedCar facility followed into production a year later (see below). This generation is not sold in the United States.

In 2004, the Colt was launched in Europe and Australia, with models including a 1.1, 1.3, and a 1.5-litre, fuel injected petrol engines with MIVEC as well as a turbocharged version of the 1.5. A three-door arrived in 2005 for Europe only.

The Smart Forfour also shared the 2003 specification chassis, with Brabus releasing a performance version of the Forfour in 2004 using the same engine as used in the 2004 European cz-T, but squeezing  extra out of the same 4G15.

In November 2004, a 1.5 L D-ID direct injection turbo-diesel version with turbocharger and intercooler, producing  was made available, with an option of the Allshift automated manual gearbox with electrohydraulic clutch and six gears.

MIVEC variable valve timing was also used to increase the output, upping the power dramatically from the  1.5 MPI. The same performance engine was also used to power the later released CZC cabrio model Colt (2005), with the more petrol-friendly 1.5 MPI available as an option.

Mitsubishi released its new Colt CZC coupé cabriolet at the Geneva Motor Show in March 2005, and the car has been on sale since 2006. The car is a 2+2 with a retractable hard-top and available with the turbo engine from the European CZ-T or as just a 1.5 MPI. Jointly developed by Mitsubishi and Pininfarina under Ken Okuyama, it was partially made in the Netherlands, with final assembly taking part at Pininfarina in Turin, Italy.

Colt Ralliart Version-R 

Mitsubishi released the Colt Ralliart Version-R in Japan on 30 May 2006. Other key features include a stiffer spot welded chassis, stiffer suspensions, improved exhaust system, improved steering mounting, body kit, 240 km/h speedometer, low profile high-grip 16-inch tires (205/45R16), and Recaro bucket seats borrowed from the Lancer Evolution VIII MR. The rear seats are moulded for two passengers, as opposed to three in the rest of the range. Incidentally, this is the same engine used in the 2004 European performance specification Colt (CZ-T), only running slightly increased horsepower figures (torque stayed the same). This version is also sold in Australia and New Zealand as the Colt Ralliart, without the 'Version-R' designation. The CVT version is officially sold in Singapore and Hong Kong under the same designation as Japan.

The CVT model's output remained as before. In Australia and New Zealand the 2008 and onwards models were fitted with lighter rims and chrome headlamps, but the sunglass holder and front Recaro seats were removed and replaced with standard sports seats to reflect a reduced retail price.

Also in 2008, a limited version called Colt Ralliart Version-R Special was launched in the Japanese market for a limited number of 300 units. The difference from the usual version is further stiffer continuous seam-welded chassis and a Ralliart muffler. Another 200 units of Version-R Special were launched in 2010.

The extensive modifications include a lowered ride height, a reinforcement of the rear axle, and a tighter coordination of shock absorbers and springs. Special front and rear spoilers and side skirts provide the appropriate visual appearance.

Colt MIEV 
In 2006 Mitsubishi displayed the Colt MIEV, using a separate electric motor at each wheel. Development of their MIEV technology was first announced May 2006 when Mitsubishi unveiled the Colt version is a rear-wheel drive all-electric vehicle fitted Colt MIEV test-bed. With two 20 kW in-wheel motors. Charge times have been suggested to be a quick as 10 minutes, although whether this is partial or full is undisclosed. It does however point to the usage of quick-charge batteries such as those developed by Toshiba.

Mitsubishi used the Colt test bed to perform on-road testing to identify and resolve any problems unique to the in-wheel motor vehicle, including any deterioration in road holding and ride comfort due to increases in unsprung weight, as well as reliability and durability issues in the in-wheel motor system and its peripheral components (suspension, wheels, tires). They simultaneously worked on developing a more powerful version of the in wheel motors for 4WD applications.

Colt Plus 

In 2004, the Colt Plus was launched in Japan, and later to other international markets. This was essentially a longer version of the standard Colt with around  more boot space compared to the regular colt. The Colt plus also features an automatic tailgate with an obstacle sensor. The tailgate can also be opened via the remote. The Colt Plus uses a 4A91 MIVEC engine instead of the 4G15 MIVEC one.

In March 2007, Mitsubishi launched Colt Plus in Taiwan, which is similar to the version launched in Japan in 2004 but the engine is different. It's powered by a 1.6-litre SOHC 4G18 engine and it's the same engine used in the 2000 Taiwanese Lancer, running slightly increased horsepower figures ( at 6,000 rpm / 14.9 kg-m at 4,500 rpm) and it uses the INVECS-III CVT transmission in fully-automatic mode. In 2008 it added a sporty version for the Taiwan market called "Colt Plus iO" which used the INVECS-III with 6-speed shift and changed the facelift to fit the styling in Japan. The Taiwanese model later received a facelift changing most of its body panels, while the Colts in other markets are replaced by the Mitsubishi Mirage.

The Colt Plus Turbo has the same feature as the Colt Plus except for the difference in engine and transmission. They use the same 4G15 engine as the 2004 European CZT with an output of 143 bhp but with 180 nm of torque. The Colt Plus Turbo also uses the Invecs III with a 6-speed sport shift.

The Colt Plus Ralliart is basically a 2006 facelifted version of the Colt Plus Turbo. It is also accompanied with leather seats.

Facelift (2008)
Colts built in the Netherlands received a facelift in 2008. The Japanese-built Colt has had the facelift in October 2009. The facelifted Colts featured revised interiors (including a new stereo, air conditioning dials, instrument cluster and other various parts). However, the 1.5 L OM639 diesel was removed from the range, with lack of demand cited.

Engines

Colt Plus facelifts (Taiwan only)

In 2013, China Motor Corporation (CMC), as the dealer of Mitsubishi cars of Taiwan conducted a major facelift on the Colt Plus. This is the second facelift of the current generation Colt Plus, and also the biggest facelift, with every single body panel redesigned and upgrading the wheels from 4 bolt wheels to 5 bolt wheels. The facelifted Colt Plus remains on sale in Taiwan alongside other long-serving Mitsubishi models like the Grand Lancer (Lancer EX), an updated version as the next generation of the 2007 international model and an updated version of the third generation Delica. A new Colt Plus X-Sports with extra exterior plastic cladding is also exclusively available in Taiwan.

In June 2017, CMC launched the third facelift for the current generation Colt Plus, and included the Dynamic Shield design featured on various late Mitsubishi products including the Outlander, Eclipse Cross, and Grand Lancer.

Colt engines 
Powertrain choices include 1.1 L engine (with 3 cylinders),1.3 L engine, INVECS-III CVT transmission, 2- or 4-wheel drive for Very (XSJH9, XSDH9), COOL Very (XSJH8, XSDH8), 1.3 RX (XSXH) models. 1.5 C (XNMH) includes 1.5 L engine, 5-speed manual transmission, 2-wheel drive.

Colt Plus engines 
Powertrain choices include 1.5 L MIVEC engine, INVECS-III CVT transmission, 2- or 4-wheel drive for Very (LSUH1), COOL Very (LSUH2), 1.3 RX (LTPH, LSPH) models. 1.5 RX also includes 6-speed sport mode settings for the CVT transmission.

Renault Clio-based Colt (2023) 

The Colt nameplate will be revived in 2023 for a rebadged fifth-generation Renault Clio.

Concept cars

The Colt was the base platform for a number of Mitsubishi concept cars.

Colt 600 convertible (1962)
The Colt 600 convertible was a concept two-seat convertible version of the production Colt 600 sedan introduced at the 9th Tokyo Motor Show in 1962 by Shin Mitsubishi Heavy-Industries, It was never offered to the public.

CZ2 (2001)
The CZ2 was a prototype urban car which presaged the next generation of the Colt.

CZ3 Tarmac (2001)
The CZ3 Tarmac was a larger version of the CZ2, sharing the same platform but with more interior space and a larger engine. It was also a possible replacement for the Mitsubishi Lancer Evolution as the company's vehicle in the World Rally Championship.

CZ3 Tarmac Spyder (2003)
The CZ3 Tarmac Spyder was a concept convertible version of the CZ3 Tarmac. It debuted at the 2003 North American International Auto Show in Detroit.

CZ2 cabriolet (2003)
The CZ2 cabriolet was a convertible version of the 2001 CZ2 prototype. It was shown at the 73rd Geneva Motor Show in Geneva, Switzerland in 2003.

Colt EV (2005)
It had a suggested price tag of US$19,000.

Notes

References 

Colt
Euro NCAP superminis
Cars introduced in 1962
Cars of the Netherlands
Cars of Italy
Cars of Taiwan
Cars of Turkey
Front-wheel-drive vehicles
All-wheel-drive vehicles
Hot hatches
1970s cars
1980s cars
1990s cars
2000s cars
2010s cars
Rally cars
Vehicles with CVT transmission
Subcompact cars
VDL Nedcar vehicles